Mladen I Šubić of Bribir (died 1304) was a Croatian nobleman who was a member of Šubić family, at the end of 13th and beginning of the 14th century.

He was a brother of a ban of Croatia Paul I Šubić of Bribir, who appointed Mladen as a commissar of the Dalmatian city of Split, along with Klis Fortress.

After Paul I Šubić declared himself as "Dominus of Bosnia" in 1299, he gave to Mladen I the title of Bosnian Ban. Stephen Kotroman had resisted the growth of Šubić's power in Bosnia, but had lost by 1300 most control over Bosnia to Mladen I Šubić. After 1302 all of Bosnia was under House of Šubić. Mladen I controlled most of it, and small part of Bosnia land (the Lower Edges) was ruled by Prince Hrvatin Stjepanić, who was a vassal of the House of Šubić, which was confirmed by Charles I of Hungary. Bosnian Ban Mladen I Šubić had started a campaign in Bosnia to exterminate the adherents of the Bosnian Church – the Bogumils. In religious conflict Mladen was killed in a battle during 1304. He was inherited by his nephew Mladen II Šubić, who needed help, so Pavao I Šubić himself had to lead an Army to crush the resistance in Bosnia. In 1305 Pavao I took the title of Lord of all of Bosnia (totius Bosniae dominus).

See also
 Šubić
 List of rulers of Croatia
 List of rulers of Bosnia
 Klis Fortress

References

Šubić
Year of birth missing
1304 deaths
Bans of Bosnia
13th-century Croatian people
14th-century Croatian people
Bosnia and Herzegovina Roman Catholics
Subic
Subic
Subic
Subic